Andrew Charles Dudish (October 13, 1918 – January 19, 2001) was an American football halfback.

Dudish was born in Wilkes-Barre, Pennsylvania, in 1918 and attended Hanover High School in Hanover, Pennsylvania. He played college football for Georgia from 1940 to 1942. He was a member of the undefeated 1942 Georgia Bulldogs football team that won a national championship. He played in Georgia's backfield with Frank Sinkwich and earned a reputation as "a vicious, savage tackler" and "one of the most outstanding defensive backs Georgia has ever known."

Dudish served in the Army from 1943 to 1945 during World War II. He suffered a fractured vertebrae in 1944 during a football game at Fort Benning.

Dudish played professional football in the All-America Football Conference for the Buffalo Bisons in 1946 and Baltimore Colts in 1947 and in the National Football League for the Detroit Lions in 1948.  He appeared in 29 professional football games, six of them as a starter, and totaled 141 rushing yards, 163 receiving yards, 622 punt and kick return yards, and two touchdowns.

After retiring as a player, Dudish worked for a life insurance company and coached youth football in Georgia. With his wife, Lugenia, he had two sons and three daughters. He died in 2001 in Lawrenceville, Georgia, of complications from pneumonia.

References

1918 births
2001 deaths
American football halfbacks
Buffalo Bisons (AAFC) players
Baltimore Colts players
Detroit Lions players
Georgia Bulldogs football players
Players of American football from Pennsylvania
United States Army personnel of World War II
Deaths from pneumonia in Georgia (U.S. state)
Baltimore Colts (1947–1950) players